Eduardo Fernández Rubiño (born 13 September 1991) is a Spanish activist, politician, member of the Assembly of Madrid and former member of the Senate of Spain.

Early life
Rubiño was born on 13 September 1991 in Madrid. He is the son of philosopher and academic Carlos Fernández Liria. He has a degree in philosophy from the Complutense University of Madrid (UCM). He was a member of the Central Delegation of Students (Delegación Central de Estudiantes) at UCM. He was an LGBT student and Youthless Future (Juventud Sin Futuro) activist. He was one of the leaders of the 15-M anti-austerity movement at UCM.

Career
Rubiño worked as a community manager. He was responsible for social networking for Podemos from 2014 to 2017. He was an online communication advisor to MEP Pablo Iglesias Turrión. He contributed to Iglesias' 2014 book Ganar o Morir: Lecciones Políticas en Juego de Tronos.

Rubiño contested the 2015 regional election as a Podemos candidate in the Community of Madrid and was elected to the Assembly of Madrid. Following the schism between Iglesias and Íñigo Errejón, Rubiño joined Errejón's Más Madrid. He was re-elected at the 2019 regional election and the 2021 Madrilenian regional election.

In July 2019 Rubiño was appointed to the Senate of Spain by the Assembly of Madrid. He left this position in July 2021.

Personal life
Rubiño is openly gay. In June 2018 he was subject to homophobic abuse at Lavapiés Metro station when, whilst hugging his boyfriend, someone shouted "fucking fag" (maricón de mierda).

Electoral history

References

External links
 
 

1991 births
Complutense University of Madrid alumni
Gay politicians
LGBT legislators in Spain
Living people
Más Madrid politicians
Members of the 10th Assembly of Madrid
Members of the 11th Assembly of Madrid
Members of the Podemos Parliamentary Group (Assembly of Madrid)
Members of the 13th Senate of Spain
Members of the 14th Senate of Spain
People from Madrid
Politicians from Madrid